Anita Amma Ankyewah Asante (born 27 April 1985) is an English football coach and former defender or midfielder who is the first-team coach at Bristol City. Asante is of Ghanaian descent, the appellation "Amma" is of Akan origin, given to girls born on Saturday. She obtained 71 caps for the English national team and was selected in the Great Britain squad for the 2012 London Olympics.

At club level, Asante has played for English clubs Arsenal, Chelsea and Aston Villa, whilst also having played for Saint Louis Athletica, Chicago Red Stars, Washington Freedom and Sky Blue FC of the American Women's Professional Soccer (WPS). She also spent six seasons playing in Sweden, two with Göteborg and then four with FC Rosengård.

Education
Asante studied politics and English BA at the Business School of Brunel University in London, whilst also benefiting from the UK "Government's Talented Athletes Scholarship Scheme", which helps athletes in full-time education. She started a PhD in the United States looking at the governorship of women's football and plans to complete after her professional playing career ends.

Club career
Asante joined her first club Arsenal as a junior in 1998. She became a senior player in 2003/2004 season. Asante was part of the Arsenal team that won the quadruple in 2006/2007, collecting the UEFA Women's Cup, FA Women's National Premier League, FA Women's Cup and the FA Women's Premier League Cup. Asante was part of the Arsenal team that made history by being the first team outside Germany or Scandinavia to win the UEFA Women's Cup. Asante is reported to have played exceptionally well in the final.

On 3 July 2008, it was announced that Asante along with teammate Lianne Sanderson had joined Chelsea Ladies. Upon signing Asante said: 

Arsenal manager Vic Akers publicly criticized the players after their departure: "You think you've the respect of players, and then they do that. It's a sorry state of affairs."

In 2009 Asante joined New Jersey–based WPS franchise Sky Blue FC. She helped the club win the inaugural WPS championship. On 6 May 2010 Asante was traded to the Saint Louis Athletica in return for India Trotter.  When the Saint Louis Athletica folded on 27 May 2010, she was acquired by the Chicago Red Stars.  She was subsequently traded to the Washington Freedom on 6 August 2010.

In December 2010 Asante returned for a second spell at Sky Blue FC, after Jim Gabarra, her coach at Washington Freedom, took the reins at Sky Blue. With the demise of WPS prior to the 2012 season, Asante signed a contract with Swedish club Kopparbergs/Göteborg FC. Her first match for Göteborg was back at Arsenal in the UEFA Women's Champions League quarter final, a 3–1 first leg defeat. Asante played 41 league games for Göteborg over the two seasons, scoring nine goals. She won the Swedish Cup and the Swedish Super Cup with KGFC, before she signed for national champions LdB FC Malmö in October 2013. Due to a foot injury, it was not expected that Asante could play in Malmö's looming Champions League fixture with holders VfL Wolfsburg. Asante, won several titles at FC Rosengård (formerly known as LdB Malmö) including the Damallsvenskan league 2014, 2015, the Swedish Cup (Svenska Cupen) 2016 and the Swedish Super Cup (Svenska Supercupen) 2016, 2017 and runners up in 2015. Anita has reached the quarter finals of Champions League three seasons with FCR.

On 7 June 2020, she signed for newly-promoted club Aston Villa, ahead of their maiden WSL campaign. Asante's first goal for her new club was the deciding goal in a 1–0 victory away to rivals Birmingham City. On 26 April 2022, Asante announced her intention to retire from playing at the end of that season. She was appointed first-team coach at FA Women's Championship club Bristol City in July 2022.

International career

England
Asante played in the England Under 17 team. She also was a member and captain of the England Under 19s and played in the inaugural FIFA World Under 19 Championship in Canada in 2002. She won 11 international caps in all at this level. She was in the first call up for the England Under 21s in 2004, a month after her senior international début.

Asante made her senior international début as a substitute against Iceland in May 2004. Her first full international was against Northern Ireland in March 2005. She scored her first international goal in only her second full international which was against Norway in April 2005. This turned out to be the winning goal. Asante was named in England's squad for Euro 2005.

Asante played in the 2011 World Cup and made her 50th senior international appearance in England's 2–0 win over eventual champions Japan. Having been part of the English squad which reached the final of Euro 2009, Asante was confident of England's chances ahead of Euro 2013. She was substituted at half time in England's 3–0 defeat to France which sealed a first round elimination.

In 2015, the politically vocal Asante was "a glaring omission" from England's squad for the 2015 World Cup in Canada. She had been the only English player to sign a petition against the controversial artificial turf used at the tournament. She criticised the head coach Mark Sampson for the manner in which he informed her of her non selection, and his unwillingness to enter into further correspondence on the matter. 

Incoming England head coach Phil Neville surprisingly recalled Asante in his first squad, for the 2018 SheBelieves Cup. At the opening match of the tournament, a 4–1 win over France, Asante suffered an anterior cruciate ligament injury and was substituted after 14 minutes.

Great Britain Olympic
In June 2012 Asante was named in the 18-player Great Britain squad for the 2012 London Olympics. She played in all four games as Great Britain were beaten 2–0 by Canada in the last eight.

Outside of football 
Asante is openly lesbian and is in a relationship with ITV News Sports reporter and presenter Beth Fisher. They married on 20 January 2023.

International goals
Scores and results list England's goal tally first

Honours
Personal
Outstanding Achievement Awards – 19 May 2006 - Presented by the Queen at Brunel University
Player of the year – (2003/04)
Sports Award – (Ghana Professional Awards 2004)
Nationwide Player of the month – March 2006
Team
UEFA Women's Cup – (Arsenal) 2007
FA Women's Cup – (Arsenal) 2004, 2006, 2007, 2008
FA Women's National Premier League – (Arsenal) 2004, 2005, 2006, 2007, 2008
FA Women's Premier League Cup – (Arsenal) 2005, 2005, 2007
Quadruple winners – 2007 (UEFA Cup, League, League Cup and FA cup)
Double winners – 2006, 2008 (League and FA Cup)
Svenska Cupen – (Göteborg) 2012
Svenska Supercupen – (Göteborg) 2013
Svenska Cupen – (FC Rosengård) 2016
Svenska Supercupen – (FC Rosengård) 2015 runners up, 2016, 2017

References

External links
 
 
 
 Player profile - Anita Asante Arsenal FC
 
 
 
 

Living people
1985 births
2011 FIFA Women's World Cup players
2007 FIFA Women's World Cup players
Alumni of Brunel University London
Arsenal W.F.C. players
Aston Villa W.F.C. players
BK Häcken FF players
Black British sportswomen
Chelsea F.C. Women players
Chicago Red Stars players
Damallsvenskan players
England women's international footballers
England women's under-23 international footballers
English expatriate sportspeople in Sweden
English expatriate sportspeople in the United States
English expatriate women's footballers
English sportspeople of Ghanaian descent
English women's footballers
England women's youth international footballers
Expatriate women's footballers in Sweden
Expatriate women's soccer players in the United States
FA Women's National League players
Women's Super League players
FC Rosengård players
Footballers at the 2012 Summer Olympics
Lesbian sportswomen
British LGBT footballers
LGBT Black British people
English LGBT sportspeople
Olympic footballers of Great Britain
NJ/NY Gotham FC players
Saint Louis Athletica players
Washington Freedom players
Women's association football defenders
21st-century English LGBT people
Women's Professional Soccer players